Ervin Skela (born 17 November 1976) is an Albanian former professional footballer who played as a midfielder.

He played the majority of his career in Germany, but he also played in Albania as well as Italy and Poland briefly. He is fourth most capped Albanian international with 75 appearances as well being the third highest goalscorer in the country's history with 13 goals.

Club career

Early career
Skela started his playing career in Albania, from a young age he was involved in football. He started his professional career with his local team KS Flamurtari Vlorë, who at the time were one of the best teams in Albania. He was at the Vlorë based club for three years from 1992 to 1995, during his time there he was loaned out to SK Tirana in 1993 but returned soon after.

Germany
After three years in Albanian football, Skela decided it was time to broaden his horizons and so moved to Germany to play for 1. FC Union Berlin. After spending three years at the Berlin club he had made over 57 appearances and scored a total of eight goals. He then moved to FC Erzgebirge Aue in 1997. In his two seasons there he made over 47 appearances and scored seven goals. in 1999 Skela moved to Chemnitzer FC where he played over 50 games and scored 11 goals. In the 2000 January transfer window he moved to SV Waldhof Mannheim who were the club who missed out on promotion that season by only a single point. But after spending only half a year at the club and making only 15 appearances he moved to Eintracht Frankfurt. After a total of three years at the club he made 92 appearances and scored 26 goals. Then Skela moved to Arminia Bielefeld where after only one season and 32 matches he hs left the club to join 1. FC Kaiserslautern in 2005. In his only season at the club he played 34 matches and scored four goals. But after a disappointing 2005–06 season which saw the club getting relegated to the 2. Bundesliga), Skela was released from his current contract with Kaiserslautern, and subsequently joined Italian side Ascoli Calcio 1898 on a free transfer in 2006.

Ascoli
He signed a one-year deal at Italian club Ascoli and made his debut on 9 September 2006. However, Skela did not manage to make his breakthrough in the starting lineup and was released for free soon after. During his time there Skela made seven appearances without scoring.

Energie Cottbus
During the January 2007 transfer window, Skela returned to Germany on 29 January 2007, with Energie Cottbus on a two and a half year contract. During his time so far at Energie Cottbus he has become a crowd favourite and one of their key players. In the 2007–08 season he played 34 matches and scored seven goals, his goals and magnificent displays in an Energie Cottbus jersey saved the club from relegation that same season. At the end of the season he had made 137 appearances in the Bundesliga and scored 21 goals in Germany's top division.

On 22 November 2008, Skela scored an historical goal in his career at Bundesliga against the giants of Bayern Munich, a match valid for the 14th week of the 2008–09 season, finished with a 4–1 loss at Allianz Arena, becoming the first and only player Albanian player to score against Bayern Munich. He scored his second goal of the season against the eventual champions VfL Wolfsburg on 26 April 2009 to secure his team a 2–0 victory and to become the first team to concede a defeat to VfL Wolfsburg after 4 months.

After two years with FC Energie Cottbus Skela left the club on 30 June 2009.

Koblenz
After four months without a club, he signed on 14 October 2009 a two-year contract with TuS Koblenz, taking the number 28. Skela made his debut in week 9 of 2009–10 season against Rot Weiss Ahlen, playing full-90 minutes in a 1–1 home draw. After the match, the coach of the team Rapolder was frustrated with the rest of the players, saying that "Skela alone cannot decide the matches" and that he expected more from the players like Shefki Kuqi, Matej Mavric, Benjamin Lense and Melinho. Skela would appear in further 17 matches with Koblenz who ended the season in 17th place, relegated from the league.

Germania Windeck
On 1 February 2011, Skela joined FC Germania Windeck.

Arka Gdynia
On 4 March 2011, Skela left Germania Windeck and signed with Arka Gdynia. Skela debuted for the first time in Polish top league on 11 March 2011, playing in the last minutes of the 2–2 away draw against Górnik Zabrze. His time with the Polish side was short-lived, as he left the club in June 2011. He appeared in only five matches, which three of them as a starter.

FC Hanau 93
Having not played professional football since leaving Arka Gdynia in 2011, Skela came out of retirement and signed with 8th tier German side FC Hanau 93 on 29 January 2014 at the age of 37. In the second part of 2013–14 season, Skela played 7 games and scored 5 goals.

During the 2014–15 season, Skela played 26 league matches and scored 18 goals, being the second goalscorer of the team behind Kahraman Damar, as the team achieved the promotion to Gruppenliga Frankfurt Ost (VII). In addition, he also scored twice in four cup games.

On 16 January 2016, Hanau confirmed via their Facebook page that Skela has extended his contract with the club for another season. In the 2015–16 season, Skela played in 11 league matches, scoring twice. In the 2016–17 season, Skela bagged 19 goals in just 18 league appearances, collecting 1528 minutes.

In the 2017–18 season, Skela was available for the team very rarely, playing only seven matches and scoring two goals, due to his occupation in obtaining UEFA Pro Licence. On 28 April 2018, he agreed another contract extension, signing a new one-year contract.

International career
Skela was first included in the Albania national football team in 2000, and since then has played a total of 75 games and scored 13 goals for his country. He also holds the unique record for the most appearances by an Albanian international in the FIFA World Cup qualification along Lorik Cana with 28 in overall. He has established himself in the first team for many years now and is now one of Albania's most important players in years. On 7 June 2013, a few minutes before the start of the 2014 FIFA World Cup qualifying match against Norway at Qemal Stafa Stadium, he and his longtime partner Altin Lala were honored by Albanian Football Association for they contributions to the national team. They received a 'plaque of appreciation' by the Albanian Football Association Armando Duka for they services to Albania national team.

Career statistics

International

Scores and results list Albania's goal tally first, score column indicates score after each Skela goal.

Honours
Individual
Albanian Footballer of the Year: 2007

References

External links
 
 
 
 

1976 births
Living people
Footballers from Vlorë
Albanian footballers
Association football midfielders
Albania international footballers
Flamurtari Vlorë players
KF Tirana players
1. FC Union Berlin players
FC Erzgebirge Aue players
Chemnitzer FC players
SV Waldhof Mannheim players
Eintracht Frankfurt players
Arminia Bielefeld players
1. FC Kaiserslautern players
Ascoli Calcio 1898 F.C. players
FC Energie Cottbus players
TuS Koblenz players
Arka Gdynia players
Kategoria Superiore players
Bundesliga players
2. Bundesliga players
Serie A players
Ekstraklasa players
Albanian expatriate footballers
Expatriate footballers in Germany
Albanian expatriate sportspeople in Germany
Expatriate footballers in Italy
Albanian expatriate sportspeople in Italy
Expatriate footballers in Poland
Albanian expatriate sportspeople in Poland